In computational phylogenetics, generalized tree alignment is the problem of producing a multiple sequence alignment and a phylogenetic tree on a set of sequences simultaneously, as opposed to separately.

Formally, Generalized tree alignment is the following optimization problem.

Input: A set  and an edit distance function  between sequences,

Note that this is in contrast to tree alignment, where the tree is provided as input.

References

Computational phylogenetics